Codium muelleri is a species of seaweed in the Codiaceae family.

In Western Australia is found along the coast in the Mid West region extending along the south coast and along as far as the east coast of Victoria.

References

muelleri
Plants described in 1856
Taxa named by Friedrich Traugott Kützing